The State of Grão-Pará and Rio Negro was one of the states of the Portuguese Empire.

History 
The state was created in 1772 by order of Sebastião José de Carvalho e Melo, 1st Marquis of Pombal, the Secretary of the State for Joseph I of Portugal.

The state was created because of the economic success of the State of Grão-Pará and Maranhão. Sebastião José de Carvalho e Melo split that state into two states, the State of Grão-Pará and Rio Negro and the State of Maranhão and Piauí, thinking that this would cause even better economic conditions, though the state split would prove a failure.

In 1775, due to economical issues in Belém and São Luis, both the State of Grão-Pará and Rio Negro and the State of Maranhão and Piauí were merged into the State of Brazil, formally unifying Portuguese America into one colony. However, the State of Grão-Pará and Rio Negro would remain autonomous of the Brazilian colonial government until 1823, when it would formally join the Empire of Brazil

References

External links

Grão-Pará and Rio Negro
Colonial Brazil
Portuguese colonization of the Americas
Former Portuguese colonies
Former subdivisions of Brazil